Lorena del Pilar Céspedes Fernández is a Chilean physics teacher who was elected as a member of the Chilean Constitutional Convention.

References

External links
 

Living people
21st-century Chilean politicians
21st-century Chilean women politicians
Non-Neutral Independents politicians
University of Chile alumni
Members of the Chilean Constitutional Convention
People from Temuco
Year of birth missing (living people)